Roderick Morrison "Eric" Chisholm (13 March 1892 – 25 September 1946) was an Australian rules footballer who played with Melbourne in the Victorian Football League (VFL).

Notes

External links 
		

1892 births
Australian rules footballers from Victoria (Australia)
Melbourne Football Club players
Australian military personnel of World War I
1946 deaths